Antônio da Silva (born 13 June 1978) is a Brazilian former professional footballer who played as a midfielder.

Career 
Da Silva began his professional career with Eintracht Frankfurt in 1997, but did not play any league matches. In 1999, he moved to SV Wehen of Regionalliga Süd. Four years later, he joined 1. FSV Mainz 05 where he completed 90 domestic league matches, before being transferred to VfB Stuttgart in 2006. He won the Bundesliga during his time there, in the 2006–07 season. He then moved to Karlsruher SC but was put on loan to Swiss side FC Basel after just one season. 

On 26 June 2009 it was announced that da Silva had signed a contract over a one-year loan to Basel, with an option of a definitive takeover. It was hoped that he could be the replacement for Basel's play-maker Ivan Ergic, who had just retired from his active football career. He joined Basel's first team during their 2009–10 season under head coach Thorsten Fink. After playing in three test games, da Silva played his domestic league debut for the club in the away game in the Kybunpark on 12 July 2009 as Basel suffered a 0–2 defeat against St. Gallen. In a test match on 13 October against an amateur selection from Sissach-Gelterkinden, da Silva scored a hat-trick within 17 minutes. He scored his first league goal for the club in the away game again in the Kybunpark against St. Gallen as Basel won the game 4–2 on 21 March 2010.

At the end of the 2009–10 season he won the Double with the club. They won the League Championship title with 3 points advantage over second placed Young Boys. The team won the Swiss Cup, winning the final 6–0 against Lausanne-Sport. Da Silva played the full 90 minutes. The club did not take their contracted option and da Silva left the club. During the season with the club, da Silva played a total of 45 games for Basel scoring a total of five goals. 25 of these games were in the Swiss Super League, three in the Swiss Cup, eight in the Europa League and nine were friendly games. He scored two goals in the domestic league and the afore mentioned hattrick in the test game.

For the 2010–11 season, he returned to the Bundesliga by signing a one-year contract with Borussia Dortmund. On 21 April 2011, he signed a new one-year contract with Borussia. He left the club at the end of the 2011–12 season.

Honours 
VfB Stuttgart
 Bundesliga: 2006–07

Basel
 Swiss Super League: 2009–10
 Swiss Cup: 2009–10

Borussia Dortmund
 Bundesliga: 2010–11, 2011–12
 DFB-Pokal : 2011–12

References

External links 
 

1978 births
Living people
Brazilian footballers
Association football midfielders
Bundesliga players
2. Bundesliga players
Swiss Super League players
CR Flamengo footballers
SV Eintracht Trier 05 players
Eintracht Frankfurt players
Eintracht Frankfurt II players
SV Wehen Wiesbaden players
1. FSV Mainz 05 players
1. FSV Mainz 05 II players
VfB Stuttgart players
Karlsruher SC players
FC Basel players
Borussia Dortmund players
Borussia Dortmund II players
MSV Duisburg players
Brazilian expatriate footballers
Brazilian expatriate sportspeople in Germany
Expatriate footballers in Germany
Brazilian expatriate sportspeople in Switzerland
Expatriate footballers in Switzerland
Footballers from Rio de Janeiro (city)